Seiminmang Manchong (born 10 January 2000), also known as Mangku Kuki, is an Indian professional footballer who plays as a forward for Sudeva Delhi in the I-League.

Club career
Born in Manipur, Manchong began his career with local club TRAU before joining the youth squad at Royal Wahingdoh in Shillong, Meghalaya.

In 2017, Manchong joined the Delhi Dynamos youth squad and immediately joined their reserve side in the I-League 2nd Division. Manchong played in Delhi Dynamos Reserves first match of the season against Lonestar Kashmir on 21 March 2018. He scored the only goal as his side won 1–0.

Delhi Dynamos / Odisha
On 16 August 2018, it was announced that Manchong would be called up to the Delhi Dynamos senior pre-season squad prior to the 2018–19 season. A month later, on 22 September, it was announced that Manchong would officially be part of the senior squad for the upcoming season.

Manchong made his senior debut for the club on 17 October 2018 against ATK. He came on as an 87th-minute substitute for Pritam Kotal as Odisha lost 1–2.

Career statistics

Club

References

External links
Profile at the Indian Super League website

2000 births
Living people
People from Manipur
Indian footballers
Association football forwards
TRAU FC players
Royal Wahingdoh FC players
Odisha FC players
I-League 2nd Division players
Indian Super League players
I-League players
Footballers from Manipur
Mohammedan SC (Kolkata) players
Sudeva Delhi FC players